2010 UEFA European Under-19 Championship (Elite Round) was the second round of qualifications for the final tournament of 2010 UEFA European Under-19 Championship.
The 28 teams that advanced from the qualifying round were distributed into seven groups of four teams each, with each group contested in a round-robin format, with one of the four teams hosting all six group games. The seven group-winning teams automatically qualified for the final tournament in France.

The hosts of the seven one-venue mini-tournament groups are indicated below in italics.

The matches were played between 14 April–31 May 2010.

Tiebreaker rules for qualification groups
Per uefa.com the criteria used to rank two or more teams even on points are:

Points earned in head-to-head matches
Goal difference in head-to-head matches
Goals scored in head-to-head matches
Goal difference in all group matches
Goals scored in all group matches
Drawing of lots

If head-to-head criteria eliminate one team from a three- or four-way tie, then revert to the first step with the remaining teams.
If two teams are tied and play against each other in their last group match, then penalty kicks will be used instead of the criteria listed above.

Group 1

Group 2

Group 3

Group 4

Group 5

Group 6

Group 7

Qualified nations

1 Only counted appearances for under-19 era (bold indicates champion for that year, while italic indicates hosts)

References

External links
Official Website

Qualification
UEFA European Under-19 Championship qualification